The Symbol of Chaos originates from Michael Moorcock's Eternal Champion stories and its dichotomy of Law and Chaos. In them, the Symbol of Chaos comprises eight arrows in a radial pattern. In contrast, the symbol of Law is a single upright arrow. It is also called the Arms of Chaos, the Arrows of Chaos, the Chaos Star, the Chaos Cross, the Star of Discord, the Chaosphere (when depicted as a three-dimensional sphere), the Symbol of Eight, or the Octaris.

The symbol has been adopted in role-playing games such as Warhammer and Dungeons & Dragons, as well as modern occult traditions, where it represents chaos magick, and also as a part of punk rock subculture and branches of modern anarchism.

Overview
Moorcock has stated that he conceived this symbol while writing the first Elric of Melniboné stories in the early 1960s. It was subsequently adopted into the pop-cultural mainstream, turning up in such places as modern occult traditions and role-playing games.

There are a number of traditional symbols that have the same geometrical pattern as Moorcock's symbol of Chaos, such as any of various eight-pointed stars, the Star of Ishtar, the Indian Dharmachakra and the Wheel of the Year, but none of these were symbols of chaos and their limbs are not arrows.

The Eight of Wands in Aleister Crowley's Thoth tarot deck features prominently an eight-pointed star with arrows at the ends. Crowley described the card as representing "energy" scattering at "high velocity" that had managed to create the depicted eight-pointed figure.

An even-more-chaotic asymmetrical representation was by Walter Simonson in the Michael Moorcock's Multiverse comic (and subsequent graphic novel).

Other uses 

The Chaos Star in its original form has been adopted by multiple Eastern European and North and Latin American activist groups affiliated to post-left anarchy, insurrectionary anarchism and nihilist anarchism. The symbol likely came into modern anarchism movements from punk artwork and zines fulfilling the need for a unified symbol similar to the Conspiracy of Fire Nuclei logo but more universal. A contributing factor to its adoption may be that its originator Moorcock himself identifies as an anarchist.

According to Anton Shekhovtsov, Aleksandr Dugin has used the symbol to represent his idea of Neo-Eurasianism, and it can be seen on the logo of his Eurasia Party and on the cover of his book Foundations of Geopolitics.

It has also been used astrologically as a symbol for the trans-Neptunian planetoid 19521 Chaos.

In popular culture 

The symbol's first appearance in a commercial role-playing game (RPG) was in TSR's Dungeons & Dragons supplement, Deities & Demigods (1980). 

In Warcraft II (1995), the Orc side's target mouse cursor has the form of chaos symbol. The symbol also appears in several artworks, which can be seen in game's manual and during mission briefings.

See also 
Arrow Cross
Celtic wheel
Christian cross variants
Hand of Eris

References

External links
 

Chaos
Chaos
Michael Moorcock's Multiverse
Chaos magic
Chaos
Chaos
Chaos